Irfan Samaling Kumi, commonly known as Irfan Jaya (born 1 May 1996), is an Indonesian professional footballer who plays as a forward for Liga 1 club Bali United and the Indonesia national team.

Club career

Persebaya Surabaya
Irfan Jaya started his professional career in 2017 after signing a four-year contract with legendary club Persebaya Surabaya when it was trying to win promotion from Liga 2. He made his debut on 20 July 2017, coming on from the bench, and helped Persebaya win 1–0 over Madiun Putra at Wilis Stadium in Madiun. He won the best Liga 2 player award at the end of the season and was a key reason behind Persebaya's return to Liga 1 (Indonesia), the country's top-flight football league.

Surviving its first year after returning to Liga 1 with a respectable result in 2018, Persebaya strongly finished second in the 2019 Liga 1 with Irfan Jaya's significant contribution from the flanks. He scored 25 goals in his four years with Persebaya and became a fan favorite until his move to PSS Sleman.

PSS Sleman
Irfan Jaya in 2021 joined Liga 1 club PSS Sleman after its new management in 2020-21 drastically improved the club, including recruiting players who could boost a middling team into a new level. He made his debut on 5 September 2021 in a match against Persija Jakarta. On 29 September 2021, Irfan scored his first goal for PSS against Persebaya Surabaya in the 87th minute at the Wibawa Mukti Stadium, Bekasi. On 15 October 2021, Irfan scored a brace against Barito Putera in the 2021–22 Liga 1 at the Manahan Stadium, Surakarta, which PSS Sleman won 3–2. A weeks later, he scored in a 4–2 lose over Persib Bandung. On 1 November 2021, Irfan scored another brace, this time in a 1–2 win over Borneo.

Bali United
In January 2022, Irfan Jaya signed a contract with Liga 1 club Bali United. He made his league debut in a 3–0 win against Barito Putera on 9 January 2022 as a substitute for Rahmat in the 58th minute at the Ngurah Rai Stadium, Denpasar. On 12 February 2022, Irfan scored his first goal for Bali United, during a 3–0 league victory against Bhayangkara. On 31 March 2022, Irfan started in Bali United's last league match against Persik Kediri, He assisted the second goal of Rahmat, as the champions ended their league campaign with a 1–3 victory. On 24 June 2022, Irfan made his AFC Cup debut in a 2–0 group stage win against Kedah Darul Aman. The following matchday, he scored his first AFC Cup goal in a 5–2 defeat against Cambodian side Visakha. On 
3 September 2022 during the match against Persebaya, Irfan suffered a fractured fibula after getting tackled by Rizky Ridho, which would kept him out for 2 months.

International career 
Irfan won his first international cap for Indonesia in a friendly match against Mauritius. He scored his first international goal for Indonesia with scored a brace in a match against Myanmar. Irfan was called into Indonesia's 2018 AFF Championship squad on 30 October 2018 by Bima Sakti.

In November 2021, Irfan was called up to the Indonesia national team in a friendly match in Turkey against Afghanistan and Myanmar by Shin Tae-yong. On 25 November 2021, he scored in a 4–1 win over Myanmar. In December 2021, he was named in Indonesian's squad for the 2020 AFF Championship in Singapore. On 12 December 2021, Irfan scored a goal against Laos in a 2020 AFF Championship group stage and he also bercame man of the match in that match. On 19 December 2021, He scored a brace in a 1–4 victory against Malaysia in Kallang.

Career statistics

Club

International 

As of match played 14 June 2022. Indonesia score listed first, score column indicates score after each Irfan goal.

List of international goals scored by Irfan Jaya

Honours

Club 
Persebaya Surabaya
 Liga 2: 2017
 Indonesia President's Cup runner-up: 2019
 East Java Governor Cup: 2020
PSS Sleman
 Menpora Cup third place: 2021
Bali United
 Liga 1: 2021–22

International
Indonesia
 AFF Championship runner-up: 2020

Individual 
 Indonesia Soccer Championship U-21 Top Goalscorer: 2016 
 Indonesia President's Cup Best 
Young Player: 2019
 Liga 2 Best Player: 2017

References

External links
 
 

1997 births
Living people
Indonesian footballers
Sportspeople from South Sulawesi
Liga 1 (Indonesia) players
Indonesia youth international footballers
Association football wingers
Footballers at the 2018 Asian Games
Asian Games competitors for Indonesia
Indonesia international footballers
Persebaya Surabaya players
PSS Sleman players
Bali United F.C. players